F-box/WD repeat-containing protein 5 is a protein that in humans is encoded by the FBXW5 gene.

This gene encodes a member of the F-box protein family, members of which are characterized by an approximately 40 amino acid motif, the F-box. The F-box proteins constitute one of the four subunits of ubiquitin protein ligase complex called SCFs (SKP1-cullin-F-box), which function in phosphorylation-dependent ubiquitination. The F-box proteins are divided into three classes: Fbws containing WD-40 domains, Fbls containing leucine-rich repeats, and Fbxs containing either different protein-protein interaction modules or no recognizable motifs. The protein encoded by this gene contains WD-40 domains, in addition to an F-box motif, so it belongs to the Fbw class. Alternatively spliced transcript variants encoding distinct isoforms have been identified for this gene, however, they were found to be nonsense-mediated Messenger RNA decay candidates, hence not represented. Well established targets of FBXW5 include TSC2 and SEC23B.

References

Further reading